Maggiora is an comune in the Province of Novara in the Italian region Piedmont.

Maggiora may also refer to:

 Maggiora (manufacturer), Italian coachbuilder from Moncalieri near Turin
 Maggiora (surname), Italian surname